Found in the Flood is the second studio album released by American post-hardcore band the Bled.

Reissue 
The Bled originally released their first album on Fiddler Records, an independent, now defunct record label. Pass the Flask sold approx 50,000 copies while on Fiddler. The Bled then signed to Vagrant Records to release their second album, Found in the Flood.

Track listing

Personnel
The Bled
Darren Simoes – bass
Jeremy Talley – guitar
James Muñoz – vocals
Ross Ott – guitar
Mike Pedicone – drums

Production
Mark Trombino – engineering, production, mixing
Maggie Taylor – album art
Stephen Looker – management

References

2005 albums
Albums produced by Mark Trombino
The Bled albums
Vagrant Records albums